The flag of Kuban is a horizontal tricolour of blue, purple, and green. The purple band is twice the width of the other two.
The flag was adopted by Kuban Parliament on 10 February 1919 as the national and state flag of the Kuban People's Republic. The colours symbolise unity of three principal social-ethnic groups of Kuban society: majority - Cossacks /purple/, autochthonous - Circassians (Adyghe) /green/, and minority - all others (non-Cossacks and non-Circassians) /blue/.

The flag of Krasnodar Krai has identical colours, but is charged with a golden coat of arms in the center.

Flag
Kuban
Kuban
Kuban